Temnostethus is a genus of minute pirate bugs in the family Anthocoridae. There are about eight described species in Temnostethus.

Species
These eight species belong to the genus Temnostethus:
 Temnostethus dacicus (Puton, 1888)
 Temnostethus fastigiatus Drake & Harris, 1926
 Temnostethus gracilis Horváth, 1907
 Temnostethus lunula Wagner, 1952
 Temnostethus pusillus (Herrich-Schaeffer, 1835)
 Temnostethus reduvinus (Herrich-Schäffer, 1850)
 Temnostethus wichmanni Wagner, 1961
 † Temnostethus blandus Statz & Wagner, 1950

References

Further reading

 
 

Anthocorini
Articles created by Qbugbot